

Monsieur Giron's Confectionery in Lexington, Kentucky, is a 2-story Greek Revival building constructed of brick in 1829. The building replaced an earlier wood frame building at the site, also occupied by Monsieur Giron's Confectionery. A 50-ft ballroom on the second floor was partitioned by folding doors into two spaces. Originally seven bays wide, only three bays in the north half of the building remain. The building's remnant was added to the National Register of Historic Places (NRHP) in 1974.

Noteworthy visitors
Giron entertained General Lafayette at the Mill Street confectionery in 1825, and Giron's cook, Dominique Ritter, made a celebrated cake for the occasion.

Mary Todd Lincoln was thought to have been one of the confectionery's best customers.

History
French immigrant Mathurin Giron arrived in Lexington in the early 19th century, and in 1812 he advertised for an apprentice to learn the confectionery business.

Giron purchased the confectionery from Henry Terrass, owner of a wood frame building on Mill Street with an upstairs ballroom, and the business included "the yellow framed house on Main Street." Giron partnered briefly with H.I.I. Robert in 1814 under the name M. Giron & H. Robert. The partnership operated at two locations, with Giron at the Mill Street site and Robert in charge of the Main Street branch.

John Darrac organized a dancing school at the ballroom in 1815, with a "practizing (sic) ball every other week." Darrac also taught French language lessons. By 1819 the dancing school was operated by Henry Guibert, and in 1820 the school was taught by Mr. Schaffer.

The ballroom also was used for dinners, lectures, and political gatherings.

Giron advertised for apprentices in 1836. In 1840 Mr. Richardson advertised his dancing school, and by that time Giron may not have been involved with the ballroom. Giron retired from the confectionery in 1844.

See also 
 Callas Sweet Shop: NRHP listing in Owensboro, Kentucky
 National Register of Historic Places listings in Fayette County, Kentucky

References

External links

Further reading
 William Kavanaugh Doty, The Confectionery of Monsieur Giron (The Michie Company, 1915)
 James Lane Allen, Flute and Violin (Harper & Brothers, 1899), "King Solomon of Kentucky"
 John Dean Wright, Lexington: Heart of the Blue Grass (University Press of Kentucky, 1982), pp 39–40. Wright cites 1837 as the year of construction.

Confectionery stores
National Register of Historic Places in Lexington, Kentucky
Greek Revival architecture in Kentucky
Commercial buildings completed in 1829
1829 establishments in Kentucky
Commercial buildings on the National Register of Historic Places in Kentucky
Individually listed contributing properties to historic districts on the National Register in Kentucky